Dinosaurs is an anthology of science fiction short works edited by Martin H. Greenberg. It was first published in hardcover by Donald I. Fine in February 1996, with a second edition issued by Niagara/Ulverscroft in October of the same year.

The book collects fourteen novelettes and short stories by various authors, together with an introduction by Robert Silverberg.

Contents
"Introduction" (Robert Silverberg)
"The Fog Horn" (Ray Bradbury)
"Day of the Hunters" (Isaac Asimov)
"Dino Trend" (Pat Cadigan)
"Time's Arrow" (Arthur C. Clarke)
"Chameleon" (Kristine Kathryn Rusch)
"Shadow of a Change" (Michelle M. Sagara)
"Strata" (Edward Bryant)
"Green Brother" (Howard Waldrop)
"Wildcat" (Poul Anderson)
"Just Like Old Times" (Robert J. Sawyer)
"The Last Thunder Horse West of the Mississippi" (Sharon N. Farber)
"Hatching Season" (Harry Turtledove)
"A Gun for Dinosaur" (L. Sprague de Camp)
"Our Lady of the Sauropods" (Robert Silverberg)

Notes

1996 anthologies
Science fiction anthologies
Martin H. Greenberg anthologies
Dinosaur books